La Tierra is a census-designated place (CDP) in Santa Fe County, New Mexico, United States. It was first listed as a CDP prior to the 2020 census.

The CDP is in northern Santa Fe County. It is bordered to the east and southeast by Tano Road and to the southwest by Las Campanas.

Demographics

Education
Much of La Tierra within Santa Fe Public Schools while some is in Pojoaque Valley Public Schools. Pojoaque Valley High School is the zoned school for Pojoaque Valley.

References 

Census-designated places in Santa Fe County, New Mexico
Census-designated places in New Mexico